Joseph Robert Micheletti (born October 24, 1954) is an American ice hockey analyst and reporter, and a former defenseman who played in 142 World Hockey Association (WHA) games with the Calgary Cowboys and Edmonton Oilers between 1977 and 1979, and 158 National Hockey League (NHL) games with the St. Louis Blues and Colorado Rockies between 1979 and 1982. He is the brother of former NHL player Pat Micheletti.

Career

Amateur career
Joe Micheletti was raised in Hibbing, Minnesota, where he attended Hibbing High School.

He played college hockey under Herb Brooks at the University of Minnesota, where he was a member of the 1974 and 1976 national championship teams. He broke team records set by Lou Nanne in both assists and points in his senior year, and was also the most valuable player of the 1976 NCAA finals.

Professional career
Originally drafted 123rd overall by the Montreal Canadiens in the 1974 NHL Entry Draft, Micheletti instead chose to start his professional career in the rival World Hockey Association with the Calgary Cowboys in 1977. He also made his international debut for the United States national team at the 1977 Ice Hockey World Championship tournament in Vienna.

As a professional, Micheletti played in 142 WHA games, mainly with the Edmonton Oilers, totalling 31 goals and 70 assists. He joined the NHL's St. Louis Blues for the 1979–80 season and later concluded his career with the Colorado Rockies. His NHL career totals were 11 goals, 60 assists for 71 points in 158 games. His playing career ended in the spring of 1982, where he was a member of the United States team at the 1982 Ice Hockey World Championship tournament in Helsinki.

Broadcasting career
Over the years, he has worked as an ice level reporter or color analyst for Fox, ESPN/ABC, and NBC broadcasts of the NHL. Micheletti worked the 1994 Winter Olympics with Jiggs McDonald for TNT and also worked the 1998 Winter Olympics for CBS. During his time with NBC, he covered hockey at the 2002, 2006, and 2010 Winter Olympics, paired with Kenny Albert and Pierre McGuire. In 2009, he became a color commentator for NHL on Versus.

On the local level, Micheletti first worked as a color commentator for the St. Louis Blues where he partnered with Dan Kelly or Ken Wilson on TV and radio. After spending three years behind the bench, he went to the Minnesota North Stars during the 1991–92 season, pairing with Dave Hodge on TV broadcasts for one season. He returned to the Blues, pairing up with Ken Wilson on TV permanently. In 1998, he joined the New York Islanders as color commentator, where he worked with Howie Rose. In 2006, he became the New York Rangers color commentator on MSG Network, partnered with Sam Rosen. He replaced long-time color commentator and former Ranger John Davidson, who had departed to take a position with the St. Louis Blues as Team President.

Coaching career
In 1987, he joined the St. Louis Blues as an assistant coach along with Barclay Plager under head coach Jacques Martin. One year later, Bob Berry joined him on that role under head coach Brian Sutter. He spent four years on that role.

Career statistics

Regular season and playoffs

International

References

External links

Joe Micheletti's profile @ hockeydraftcentral.com
MSG Network - Joe Micheletti

1954 births
American television reporters and correspondents
American television sports announcers
Calgary Cowboys players
Cincinnati Stingers draft picks
Colorado Rockies (NHL) players
Edmonton Oilers (WHA) players
Ice hockey people from Minnesota
Living people
Minnesota Golden Gophers men's ice hockey players
Montreal Canadiens draft picks
National Hockey League broadcasters
New York Islanders announcers
New York Rangers announcers
People from International Falls, Minnesota
St. Louis Blues coaches
St. Louis Blues players
Sportspeople from Hibbing, Minnesota
American men's ice hockey defensemen
NCAA men's ice hockey national champions
Ice hockey players from Minnesota